The Journal of Astronomical Instrumentation is a quarterly peer-reviewed scientific journal that covers astronomical instruments and its various components being proposed, developed, under construction, and in use. The journal focuses on astronomical instrumentation topics in all wavebands (radio wave to gamma ray) and includes the disciplines of heliophysics, space weather, lunar and planetary science, exoplanet exploration, and astroparticle observation (cosmic rays, cosmic neutrinos, etc.). It was established in 2012 and is published by World Scientific. The journal occasionally publishes thematic issues on specific topics or projects.

Abstracting and indexing 
The journal is abstracted and indexed in:
 Astrophysics Data System
 EBSCO databases
 Emerging Sources Citation Index
 InfoTrac databases
 INSPIRE-HEP
 Scopus

References

External links 
 

Astronomy journals
Publications established in 2012
World Scientific academic journals
English-language journals
Quarterly journals
Engineering journals